Constituent Assembly elections were held in newly independent Israel on 25 January 1949. Voter turnout was 86.9%. Two days after its first meeting on 14 February 1949, legislators voted to change the name of the body to the Knesset (Hebrew: כנסת, translated as Assembly). It is known today as the First Knesset.

Background

During the establishment of the state of Israel in May 1948, Israel's national institutions were established, which ruled the new state. These bodies were not elected bodies in the pure sense, and their members originated from the management of the Jewish agency and from the management of the Jewish National Council.

The Israeli Declaration of Independence stated that:

However, the elections were not held before the designated date due to the ongoing war and were cancelled twice. The elections were eventually held on 25 January 1949.

Preparations for the elections
These were the first elections held in Israel, and as such they demanded special preparations. On 5 November 1948 the Provisional State Council decided that the Constituent Assembly would consist of 120 members. On 8 November 1948 a population census was held which was later used in part for the preparations of the voters guide (the census was essential due to the rise of new immigrants and because of the Arab inhabitants of the British Mandate became refugees after the war). For the purpose of the census the entire country was under curfew for seven hours, from five in the afternoon and until midnight. Another issue was the issue of the Electoral System. Suggestions were made of different Electoral Systems, but eventually it was decided to maintain the relative electoral system which existed in the elections for the Assembly of Representatives of the Jewish community in British controlled Palestine, and that the Constituent Assembly elected would be the one to determine the future electoral system in Israel.

A thousand polling stations were prepared across the country. According to census, the number of eligible voters consisted of half a million people.

Contesting parties 
A total of 21 parties registered to contest the elections.

Results

Aftermath
On 19 May 1948, the Provisional Assembly confirmed Hebrew and Arabic as the official languages of Israel, removing English as an official language. The Constituent Assembly convened in February 1949.

During the Knesset term Eliezer Preminger left Maki and re-established the Hebrew Communists before joining Mapam, while Ari Jabotinsky and Hillel Kook, both associated with the Bergson Group in the United States, broke away from Herut; they were not recognised as a separate party by the speaker.

First government

The first government was formed on 8 March 1949 with David Ben-Gurion as Prime Minister. His Mapai party formed a coalition with the United Religious Front, the Progressive Party, the Sephardim and Oriental Communities and the Democratic List of Nazareth, and there were 12 ministers. Yosef Sprinzak of Mapai was appointed as the speaker.

On 16 February 1949, the First Knesset elected Chaim Weizmann as the first (largely ceremonial) President of Israel.  It also passed an educational law in 1949 which introduced compulsory schooling for all children between the ages of 5 to 14. On 5 July 1950, it passed the Law of Return.

The trend of political instability in Israel was started when Ben-Gurion resigned on 15 October 1950 over disagreements with the United Religious Front on education in the new immigrant camps and the religious education system, as well as demands that the Supply and Rationing Ministry be closed and a businessman appointed as Minister for Trade and Industry.

Second government

Ben-Gurion formed a second government on 1 November 1950 with the same coalition partners as previously, though there was a slight reshuffle in his cabinet; David Remez moved from the Transportation ministry to Education, replacing Zalman Shazar (who was left out of the new cabinet), whilst Dov Yosef replaced Remez as Minister of Transportation. Ya'akov Geri was appointed Minister of Trade and Industry despite not being a Member of the Knesset. There was also a new Deputy Minister in the Transportation ministry.

The door was opened for the elections for the second knesset when the government resigned on 14 February 1951 after the Knesset had rejected the Minister of Education and Culture's proposals on the registration of schoolchildren.

See also
List of members of the first Knesset

References

External links
Historical overview of the First Knesset Knesset website 
Factional and Government Make-Up of the First Knesset Knesset website 

Legislative
Legislative election
Legislative elections in Israel
Israel
Israel